The Snowcrest Range,  el. , is a small mountain range southeast of Dillon, Montana in Madison County, Montana. The Snowcrest and adjacent Gravelly Range is one of Montana's most popular hunting grounds. The two mountain ranges are home to nearly 10,000 elk and a growing population of grizzly bears.

The Snowcrest Range is extremely wild, with about 166,000 acres of roadless country, including 97,000 acres of roadless National Forest, as well as adjacent private and state lands.

Wolke characterizes the Snowcrest thus: "Spectacular grassland foothills and slopes rise through a thin band of Limber Pine, Douglas-Fir, Aspen, spruce, and fir to alpine summits . . . [t]his is high, dry, east-slope country, and the rich habitat mosaic is superb for Elk, Bighorn, Moose, Mule Deer, Red Tailed Hawk, Swainson's Hawk and Golden Eagle." The Snowcrest Range receives very little use outside of hunting season.

Sunset Peak, el. 10,581, is the highest point in the Snowcrest Range. (Although Wolke lists Sunset's elevation at 10,573, Peakbagger.com lists its elevation as 10,581).

See also
 List of mountain ranges in Montana

Notes

Mountain ranges of Montana
Landforms of Madison County, Montana